Tom and Jerry & Tex Avery Too! Volume 1: The 1950s is a 2006 soundtrack album containing Scott Bradley's film scores from Metro-Goldwyn-Mayer's Tom and Jerry, Droopy and Tex Avery theatrical cartoon shorts. These cartoons' soundtracks were selected as the first release because they had the best sound quality. A second volume was digitally released in 2010.

Track listing

References

2006 soundtrack albums
Film soundtracks
Tom and Jerry